Operation Secret Storm is an action-oriented NES game where players control a secret agent named George B. (which was seen by many as a caricature of then-President George H. W. Bush) as he fights the Iraqi army. The player fights a lot of Arabs as he gets deeper and deeper into Iraq. During the development of the game, Operation Desert Storm was a hot topic on the news and the developers rushed the game to release it before the conflict could end.

Reception
Saddam Hussein, as he appears in this game, is ranked eighth in Electronic Gaming Monthly’s list of the top ten video game politicians. The game's superhero caricature of George H. W. Bush was ranked as one of the greatest video game Presidents by G4.

References

External links

Operation Secret Storm at GameFAQs

1992 video games
Action video games
Nintendo Entertainment System games
Nintendo Entertainment System-only games
Unauthorized video games
North America-exclusive video games
Video games based on real people
Video games set in Iraq
Color Dreams games
Gulf War video games
Spy video games
Video games developed in the United States
Cultural depictions of Saddam Hussein
Cultural depictions of George H. W. Bush

Single-player video games